The Universal Baseball Association, Inc., J. Henry Waugh, Prop. is Robert Coover's second novel, published in 1968.

Plot summary
J. Henry Waugh is an accountant, albeit an unhappy one.  However, each night after he comes home from work, Henry immerses himself in a world of his choosing: a baseball league in which every action is ruled by the dice.

The novel opens with the excitement of a perfect game in progress.  Henry, as owner of every team in the league, is flush with pride in the young rookie, who is pitching this rarest of rare games: Damon Rutherford, "son" of one of the league's all-time greats.

When the young hurler completes the miracle game, Henry's life lights up.  Giddy with happiness, Henry pushes himself and his league to the limits as he plays game after game so that he can see the young boy pitch again.

As fate would have it, the rookie Rutherford is killed by a bean-ball, a rare play from "the Extraordinary Occurrences Chart" in the game that Henry has invented and has used to see fifty-six "seasons" to conclusion.  That Henry is also fifty-six marks a turning point in Henry's life.  The "death" of the young pitcher on the table-top affects the real-life Henry in ways unimaginable.  As Henry's personal life spirals out of control, he finally arrives at the solution that will save his league, his creation, and, ultimately, his sanity.

Analysis
The novel is termed a "black comic" novel, as the book takes the reader back and forth between the real world and the fantasy world that Henry has created.  The parts of the book that show us the "Universal Baseball Association" show us the fantasy world from the perspective, not of Henry, but of the players in the Association.  Through these expositions, the players, managers, and league executives come to life.

Robert Coover's work here delves into deep philosophical issues, one of which is the notion of creationism.  Henry, through his game, has become a "god" of sorts.  His game determines who lives and who dies, who fails and who succeeds.  It has been suggested that the name, "J. Henry Waugh", is a veiled reference to "Yahweh", one of the Hebrew names of God in Judaism.

Critical response
John Sexton, president of New York University, called the book "the best book written about baseball by anyone", a "Joycean world, where a character has on his kitchen table a game run by the roll of dice, in which he's created an alternative baseball league that's more real to him than his life and real baseball ... And he has to decide whether he's going to intervene to change that or not. Now, doesn't that resonate to you about-- free will, free destiny?"  New York Times writer Matt Weiland, writing about the 2011 reissue of the book, called it "one of the best baseball novels", commenting, "There is something terrifying about the U.B.A., but as with all tragedy it is a terror that once seen, and lived through, yields a stronger sense of being alive".

References

1968 American novels
American comedy novels
Baseball novels
Black comedy books
Random House books
Postmodern novels